William Penn Lodge (May 2, 1890 – June 4, 1950) was an American football coach. He was the third head football coach at Southern Illinois Normal College—now known as Southern Illinois University Carbondale—serving for one season, in 1919, and compiling a record of 2–2. Lodge was born in Philadelphia on May 2, 1890. He was a graduate of Battle Creek College—now known as Andrews University—in Berrien Springs, Michigan. Lodge served as a captain in the United States Marine Corps during World War I, receiving the Bronze Star Medal. He was later a medical health officer at Battle Creek Sanitarium and ran a sanitarium in Norristown, Pennsylvania. Lodge also worked as a coroner in Ocean County, New Jersey and as the town clerk for Long Beach Township, New Jersey. He died in Long Beach on June 4, 1950.

Head coaching record

College

References

External links
 

1890 births
1950 deaths
American coroners
United States Marine Corps personnel of World War I
Southern Illinois Salukis football coaches
United States Marine Corps officers
Andrews University alumni
People from Ocean County, New Jersey
Sportspeople from Philadelphia
Military personnel from Pennsylvania